Samantha Jo "Mandy" Moore (born March 28, 1976) is an American choreographer, dancer, producer, and dance instructor. She is known for her work on the United States reality television series So You Think You Can Dance, having appeared on the show every year since the third season, and Dancing with the Stars. She choreographed the 2016 film La La Land and has also worked on stage musicals and commercials. She has created dance numbers for the Academy Awards, Golden Globe Awards, Emmy Awards, and Grammy Awards ceremonies. She has been nominated seven times for a Primetime Emmy Award for Outstanding Choreography, winning in 2017 for her work on Dancing with the Stars, in 2018 for her work on So You Think You Can Dance, and in 2020 for Zoey's Extraordinary Playlist.

Early life and education

Samantha Jo Moore was born on March 28, 1976, in St. Louis, Missouri, and grew up in Summit County, Colorado. Her parents are Bob and Wendy Moore, and she has one sister. She enjoyed dancing from a very young age. A public school student, she studied at the Summit School of Dance in Breckenridge under the school's founder, Kim Delgrosso, from age 7 to 18. She also attended the Perry-Mansfield Performing Arts School & Camp in Steamboat Springs for three summers. While attending Summit High School, she attended the Shelly True Dance Academy in Denver several times a week. She also participated in high school basketball, track, and gymnastics.

Moore moved to Los Angeles after graduating from high school in 1994 to pursue a career in dance. She attended the EDGE Performing Arts Center in Los Angeles on a scholarship from the Summit Foundation.

Career

Television
Moore was first hired by Carrie Ann Inaba to help out with some television dance projects, which led to her assisting with auditions for the reality show So You Think You Can Dance. She signed on for season 1 of So You Think You Can Dance as assistant to the choreographer. By season 3 she was choreographing dance numbers and by season 14 she was serving as creative producer. In 2018 she was named as a judge for Dancing with the Stars: Juniors. She was a guest judge (fill in), replacing Craig Revel Horwood on the first episode of Dancing with the Stars (Australian Season 17).

Among her television credits are Glee and American Idol (Fox), The Fresh Beat Band (Nickelodeon), Disney's 60th Anniversary Celebration (ABC), Modern Family, and "XQ Super School Live".  Moore is an executive producer of NBC's musical comedy-drama Zoey's Extraordinary Playlist, as well as the show's choreographer. She also appears as the auditioner in episode 11.

Film
Moore has choreographed dance numbers for several David O. Russell films, starting with Silver Linings Playbook (2012)—for which she trained actors Bradley Cooper and Jennifer Lawrence to perform a mashup of different dance styles—American Hustle (2013), and Joy (2015); she also did choreography for Leslye Headland's Sleeping With Other People (2015).

Her most notable work to date is the 2016 film La La Land, for which she choreographed all the dance numbers, both large-scale and small-scale. To choreograph the opening number, "Another Day of Sun", which took place in a traffic jam on a Los Angeles freeway ramp, Moore blocked out the action on paper and then began staging the moves using a group of ten dancers in a studio parking lot. The final scene involved 30 dancers, 100 extras, and 60 cars. Moore trained the lead actors, Ryan Gosling and Emma Stone, both dance novices, over a period of six to eight weeks. She emphasized emotion rather than technique, as Stone recalled:

"[Moore] tried to impart to us that, as much as we need to be technical and think of all of our steps, it's going to be about our faces. We need to see the joy and connection. We need to look at each other and smile at each other. We need to keep acting".

Stage
Moore's stage credits include the New Wave L.A. Program created by the Los Angeles Ballet, a segment of Celine Dion's 2008 Taking Chances World Tour, Strictly Come Dancing, Cirque du Soleil's Michael Jackson: The Immortal World Tour; and Shania Twain's Las Vegas show, Shania: Still the One.

Moore directed and choreographed the Aurora, Colorado, production of The Wedding Singer in 2011, and was the choreographer for the world premiere of the 2013 musical "Nobody Loves You" at the Old Globe Theatre in San Diego, California, which she subsequently brought Off-Broadway to the Second Stage Theater in Manhattan.

Other venues
Moore has also choreographed routines for commercials, awards ceremonies, and fund-raisers. Her commercial credits include ads for Target, Amazon Prime, and Skechers. In 2017 she choreographed dance numbers for all four major US awards ceremonies—the Academy Awards, Golden Globe Awards, Emmy Awards, and Grammy Awards. For the Golden Globes ceremony that year, she choreographed Jimmy Fallon's opening take-off on the "Another Day of Sun" film scene. Among the fund-raisers she has choreographed are "Dancing with the Mountain Stars", a fund-raiser for the St. Anthony Summit Medical Center, and the 21st Annual Steve Chase Humanitarian Awards in Palm Springs, California, in 2015, benefitting the Desert AIDS Project.

Professional dancing
Moore has danced on film in A Time for Dancing (2002), Austin Powers in Goldmember (2002), and Did You Hear About the Morgans? (2008), and in the television sitcom Malcolm in the Middle.

Teaching
Moore teaches at the EDGE Performing Arts Center and is a faculty member of JUMP weekend dance conventions for children. She also teaches in private studios and has led dance workshops in Italy (Mediterraneo Dance Festival), Australia, and Korea.

She is a member of the Board of Governors of the Television Academy, and as of 2017 heads that body's Choreographers Peer Group.

Dance styles
Moore is proficient in choreographing many different types of dance, including contemporary, jazz, ballroom, tap, and folk. She is known for training dancers on all levels and of all ages.

Awards and honors
Since 2008, Moore has been nominated seven times for a Primetime Emmy Award for Outstanding Choreography. She won in 2017 for her work on season 23 of Dancing with the Stars ("On Top of the World" and "Carol of the Bells"), and in 2018 for her work on So You Think You Can Dance ("Brand New" and "To Make You Feel My Love"). In 2020, Moore received a juried Emmy Award for the first season of Zoey's Extraordinary Playlist.

Personal life
To avoid being confused with her better-known namesake, singer Mandy Moore, Moore registered with the Screen Actors Guild under the name Mandy Jo Moore. Still, the two are often confused, and with tongue in cheek, Moore named her corporation "Nope Not Her". She also uses the handle @nopenother on social media.

References

External links

"La La Land's Choreographer Explains the Freeway Dance Scene" (video) Vanity Fair, April 25, 2017

1976 births
Living people
American women choreographers
American choreographers
American female dancers
Artists from St. Louis
Artists from Los Angeles
Primetime Emmy Award winners
So You Think You Can Dance choreographers
20th-century American women
21st-century American women
20th-century American people